2429 Schürer, provisional designation , is a Maria asteroid from the central region of the asteroid belt, approximately  in diameter. It was discovered on 12 October 1977, by Swiss astronomer Paul Wild at Zimmerwald Observatory near Bern, Switzerland, and later named after Swiss astronomer Max Schürer. The likely elongated S-type asteroid has a rotation period of 6.6 hours.

Orbit and classification 

Schürer is a member of the Maria family (506), a large family of stony asteroids with nearly 3000 known members, named after asteroid 170 Maria. The family is old, about  years, and located near the 3:1 resonant region with Jupiter that supplies near-Earth objects to the inner Solar System. It is estimated that every 100 million years, about 37 to 75 Maria asteroids larger than 1 kilometer become such near-Earth objects.

It orbits the Sun in the central main-belt at a distance of 2.3–2.8 AU once every 4 years and 1 month (1,507 days; semi-major axis of 2.57 AU). Its orbit has an eccentricity of 0.10 and an inclination of 15° with respect to the ecliptic. The body's observation arc begins with a precovery taken at Heidelberg Observatory in October 1915, or 62 years prior to its official discovery observation at Zimmerwald.

Naming 

This minor planet was named in honor of Swiss astronomer Max Schürer (1910–1997), who was director of the Astronomical Institute of the University of Bern from 1947 to 1980. Due to his initiative, endurance, and great technical competence, the discovering observatory at Zimmerwald – after which the asteroid 1775 Zimmerwald is named – could be built in 1956. He did a lot of orbit computation on asteroids when he was a pupil of astronomer Sigmund Mauderli (1876–1962), who was the preceding director of the Astronomical Institute (also see 1748 Mauderli). Schürer also dealt with stellar dynamics and was deeply involved as a pioneer in satellite geodesy. The official  was published by the Minor Planet Center on 10 November 1992.

Physical characteristics 

Schürer is an assumed S-type asteroid, and corresponds to the overall stony spectral type of the Maria family.

Rotation period 

In February 2012, a rotational lightcurve of Schürer was obtained from photometric observations by an international collaboration under the lead of South Korean astronomers. Lightcurve analysis gave a rotation period of  hours with a brightness amplitude of 0.77 magnitude, indicative of an elongated, non-spherical shape.

A modeled lightcurve using photometric data from Gaias DR2 catalog was published in 2018. It gave a similar sidereal period of  hours, as well as a spin axis at (235.0°, −26.0°) in ecliptic coordinates (λ, β).

Diameter and albedo 

According to the surveys carried out by the NEOWISE mission of NASA's Wide-field Infrared Survey Explorer, Schürer measures between 11.58 and 16.0 kilometers in diameter and its surface has an albedo between 0.096 and 0.229. while the Japanese Akari satellite gives a diameter of 15.95 km with a low albedo of 0.096. The Collaborative Asteroid Lightcurve Link assumes an albedo of 0.21 and calculates a diameter of 11.55 kilometers based on an absolute magnitude of 12.0.

References

External links 
 Asteroid Lightcurve Database (LCDB), query form (info )
 Dictionary of Minor Planet Names, Google books
 Discovery Circumstances: Numbered Minor Planets (1)-(5000) – Minor Planet Center
 Max Schürer (1910–1997), Historical Dictionary of Switzerland
 Max Schürer, History of the Astronomical Institute of the University of Bern
 
 

002429
Discoveries by Paul Wild (Swiss astronomer)
Named minor planets
19771012